Jailor is a 1958 Hindi psychosocial melodrama film produced and directed by Sohrab Modi. The film was a remake of Modi's earlier Jailor (1938). The production company was Minerva Movietone, with story and dialogue written by Kamal Amrohi. The additional dialogue was by O. P. Dutta and screenplay by J. K. Nanda. Music for the film was composed by Madan Mohan with lyrics by Rajendra Krishan. Sohrab Modi cast himself once again in the title role of the Jailor. The film co-starred Kamini Kaushal, Geeta Bali, Abhi Bhattacharya, Daisy Irani, Nana Palsikar, Eruch Tarapore and Pratima Devi.

The story involved a Jailor played by Modi, whose wife Kamal (Kamini Kaushal) elopes with Dr. Ramesh, enacted by Abhi Bhattacharya, turning him into a bitter and tyrannical misogynist.

Plot
Dilip (Sohrab Modi) is a kind-hearted prison warden (Jailor), who lives with his wife Kanwal (Kamini Kaushal) and little daughter Bali (Daisy Irani). Kanwal enjoys herself by staying out late at parties and meeting people. She equates her life in the house as a jail. Dilip tells her that her life is within the four walls of the house, and orders her not to go out without his permission. Kanwal hates the scar on her husband's face and taunts Dilip about his ugly looks. Kanwal finally elopes with Dr. Ramesh, leaving her daughter behind. This turns Dilip into a hard cruel man who becomes oppressive. Kanwal and Dr. Ramesh go through hardships with Ramesh turning blind and Kanwal becoming disfigured following an accident. Dilip goes to the hospital and brings Kanwal back home. He has her locked up in her room forbidding her to meet her daughter. His constant taunts and berating compel Kanwal to commit suicide. Bali falls sick and dies.

In the meantime, Dilip has come across a blind girl Chhaya (Geeta Bali), whose brother, Dilip had saved from killing himself. Her brother (Raj Kumar) kills the evil Chowdhary (Nana Palsikar), who tries to molest Chhaya. Before going to jail, he asks Dilip to look after his blind sister. Dilip's attitude towards women starts changing as he feels drawn to Chhaya. But he finds that Chhaya is also in love with Dr. Ramesh, who has been living in a temple since his accident. Chhaya and Ramesh had met earlier in the temple, but were separated by the cunning Chowdhary. Dilip goes in search of him and decides to donate his savings to different temples. At one of the temples, Chhaya and Dilip come across Ramesh. Chhaya and Ramesh are finally united with their sight restored.

Cast
 Sohrab Modi as Jailor Dilip
 Kamini Kaushal as Kamal
 Geeta Bali as Chhaya
 Abhi Bhattacharya as Dr. Ramesh
 Daisy Irani as Bali
 Nana Palsikar as Ram Singh Chaudhary

Soundtrack
The music director was Madan Mohan with lyrics by Rajendra Krishan. The playback singers were Lata Mangeshkar, Asha Bhosle, Mohammed Rafi and Mahendra Kapoor.

Songlist

References

External links

1958 films
1950s Hindi-language films
1958 drama films
Indian drama films
Remakes of Indian films
Films directed by Sohrab Modi
Films scored by Madan Mohan
Hindi-language drama films